Gabriel Rojas may refer to:

 Gabriel Rojas (footballer, born 1997), Argentine defender for San Lorenzo de Almagro
 Gabriel Rojas (footballer, born 1999), Chilean forward for Santiago Wanderers